Ballophilus braunsi is a species of arthropod in the genus Ballophilus. It is found in South Africa. It has two subspecies: Ballophilus braunsi braunsi and 	
Ballophilus braunsi nimbanus. The original description of this species is based on female specimens with 59 or 61 pairs of legs, but males of this species can have as few as 57 leg pairs.

References 

Ballophilidae
Arthropods of South Africa
Animals described in 1907